Hirnytske is an urban-type settlement in Nikopol Raion of Dnipropetrovsk Oblast in Ukraine. Hirnytske is located on the left bank of the Solona, a tributary of the Dnieper, and northeast of Pokrov. It belongs to Pokrov urban hromada, one of the hromadas of Ukraine. Population: 

Until 18 July 2020, Hirnytske belonged to Pokrov Municipality, the administrative division subordinated to the city of oblast significance of Pokrov. The municipality was abolished in July 2020 as part of the administrative reform of Ukraine, which reduced the number of raions of Dnipropetrovsk Oblast to seven. The area of Pokrov Municipality was merged into Nikopol Raion.

Economy

Transportation
Hirnytske is bounded by a railway from the south, bit this railway has no passenger traffic. The closest passenger railway station is in Chortomlyk, on the railway connecting Zaporizhzhia with Kryvyi Rih.

There is road access to Pokrov and Nikopol and further to Highway H23 which connects Zaporizhzhia and Kryvyi Rih.

References

Urban-type settlements in Nikopol Raion